The 1917–18 Hong Kong First Division League season was the 10th since its establishment.

Overview
Royal Garrison Artillery won the championship.

References
RSSSF

1917-18
1917–18 domestic association football leagues
1917 in Hong Kong
1918 in Hong Kong